Niklas Jörgen Karlsson (born 1974) is a Swedish politician and member of the Riksdag, the national legislature. A member of the Social Democratic Party, he has represented Skåne County West since September 2014.

Karlsson is the son of politician Anders Karlsson. He was educated in Landskrona and Lund University. He was a sergeant in the Wendes Artillery Regiment. He has been a member of the municipal council in Landskrona Municipality since 1994.

References

1974 births
Living people
Members of the Riksdag 2014–2018
Members of the Riksdag 2018–2022
Members of the Riksdag 2022–2026
Members of the Riksdag from the Social Democrats
People from Landskrona Municipality